Paula Marshall (born June 12, 1964) is an American actress.

Career
In 1990, Marshall had a guest role as Iris West, the love interest of Flash (Barry Allen) in the pilot episode on the short-lived Flash. In 1991, she guest-starred on Superboy with a young Clark Kent before he called himself Superman, playing the villainous Christina Riley, a woman who is, in secret, a werewolf. Both series are part of DC Comics media. In 1992, Marshall had a three-episode guest role on The Wonder Years and later guest-starred on shows such as Seinfeld, Nash Bridges, Grapevine and Diagnosis: Murder. Later in 1992, she appeared in the movie Hellraiser III: Hell on Earth as Terri. In 1994, she got her first sitcom role on Wild Oats. In 1995, Marshall starred in the science fiction cult classic W.E.I.R.D. World, directed by William Maloneas, as Dr. Abby O'Reardon, an evil scientist who rejuvenates her boss (and later becomes his mother) and is bent on turning grown men into babies. After a few years in B movies, Marshall gained a role on 1997's Chicago Sons. The same year, she landed a recurring role on Spin City and starred with Bette Midler and Dennis Farina in the film That Old Feeling, where her character fell in love with the paparazzo played by Danny Nucci.

Marshall has been cast in several pilots that were not picked up, including the Elizabeth Lackey series Cooking Lessons and Rob Thomas's Sticks.

Marshall was on Rob Thomas's Cupid, premiering in 1998. It featured her as Dr. Claire Allen, a psychiatrist supervising a man named Trevor (Jeremy Piven) who thinks he is Cupid. Marshall then joined David E. Kelley's Snoops about an unconventional detective agency.

In 2000, Marshall returned to television screens: first with a three-episode guest appearance as a porn star and love interest for Jeremy (Joshua Malina) on Aaron Sorkin's Sports Night, and then in Cursed (a.k.a. The Weber Show). In 2002, she guest starred on Just Shoot Me! as the daughter of Nina Van Horn.

Hidden Hills was an offbeat comedy about three families in suburbia. Marshall also had a secondary role in the Steve Martin-Bonnie Hunt remake of Cheaper by the Dozen and a cameo appearance in Break a Leg, which starred her husband Danny Nucci.

In 2004, Marshall appeared in an episode of the tv show Miss Match, but the series was cancelled before it aired. In October, she had a four-episode role in Veronica Mars, (created by Rob Thomas), and she reprised the role toward the end of season two. Marshall's next main role came in the sitcom Out of Practice.

In 2007, Marshall appeared in the Showtime series Californication. She also was seen in the FX series Nip/Tuck as an insecure actress who dated Dr. Sean McNamara.

In 2008, Marshall joined the crime drama Shark as a recurring character.

Marshall starred on the CBS sitcom Gary Unmarried. She and Jay Mohr played a divorced couple sparring while trying to be loving parents to their two children. The show was her first to be picked up for a second season.

Marshall had a guest role in the hit drama House, playing Julia, sister of Lisa Cuddy.

In 2012, Marshall guest starred in an episode of CSI: Crime Scene Investigation. She played the role of Kathy Veck, owner of an oil company.

In 2013, Marshall guest starred in two episodes of Two and a Half Men as Alan Harper's transgender girlfriend Paula.

Personal life
Marshall is from Rockville, Maryland. She has been married to actor Danny Nucci since 2003, and the couple have a daughter. 

She is the sister of Virginia politician Bob Marshall, who became widely known for proposing a "bathroom bill" (a law that would have limited transgender individuals access to public restrooms of their born sex) before his defeat by transgender candidate Danica Roem in the November 2017 state election. Paula Marshall attributed his defeat to "karma" for his "homophobic" acts.

Filmography

Film

Television

Radio and podcast appearances
Marshall appeared on Janet Varney's JV Club Podcast Episode #145 on March 12, 2016.

Marshall appeared on Ken Reid's TV Guidance Counselor podcast on February 7, 2017.

References

External links

1964 births
American film actresses
American television actresses
Living people
Actresses from Maryland
People from Rockville, Maryland
20th-century American actresses
21st-century American actresses